Sir William James Ingram, 1st Baronet (27 October 1847 – 18 December 1924) was Managing Director of The Illustrated London News and a Liberal politician who sat in the House of Commons in three periods between 1878 and 1895.

Life
Ingram was the son of Herbert Ingram and his wife Ann Little, daughter of William Little, of the Manor House, Eye, Northamptonshire. His father was the founder of The Illustrated London News, and had also been MP for Boston in Lincolnshire. Ingram was educated at Winchester College and Trinity College, Cambridge. He was admitted at the Middle Temple on 12 April 1869, and at the Inner Temple on 15 January 1870 and was called to the bar at Inner Temple on 18 November 1872.

His father and brother died in a shipping accident on Lake Michigan in 1860 and Ingram eventually took over management of the Illustrated London News. He lived at Walton-on-Thames, Surrey and was a J.P. for Surrey and the Cinque Ports, Kent.

In 1874, Ingram was elected as MP for Boston and held the seat until 1880 when representation was suspended. He won the reconstituted seat in 1885 but lost it in the election of the following year. He regained the seat in 1892 but lost it again three years later in 1895. Ingram was created baronet on 9 August 1893.

Ingram married in 1874, Mary Eliza Collingwood Stirling, daughter of Australian politician Edward Stirling of 34, Queen's Gardens, Hyde Park, and of Adelaide, South Australia. His son Herbert succeeded to the baronetcy.
Another son was Collingwood Ingram.

References

External links 
 

1847 births
1924 deaths
People educated at Winchester College
Alumni of Trinity College, Cambridge
English businesspeople
19th-century British newspaper publishers (people)
Baronets in the Baronetage of the United Kingdom
Liberal Party (UK) MPs for English constituencies
UK MPs 1874–1880
UK MPs 1885–1886
UK MPs 1892–1895
People from Westgate-on-Sea